Dimbleby is an English-language surname, notable bearers of which include the following:

Richard Dimbleby (1913–1965), BBC television news commentator and war reporter
David Dimbleby (born 1938), elder son of Richard, journalist and host of BBC Election Night coverage from 1979 to 2017
Josceline Dimbleby (born 1943), first wife of David, former cookery correspondent for The Sunday Telegraph

Henry Dimbleby (born 1970), son of David, businessman, cook and food writer
Kate Dimbleby (born 1973), daughter of David, cabaret singer and songwriter

Jonathan Dimbleby (born 1944), younger son of Richard, radio and television journalist and historian
Bel Dimbleby aka Bel Mooney (born 1946), first wife of Jonathan, journalist and broadcaster

See also
 Dimbleby & Capper, a stage name of singer-songwriter Laura Bettinson
 Richard Dimbleby Cancer Fund, a charity 
 Richard Dimbleby Lecture or Dimbleby Lecture, founded in the memory of Richard Dimbleby

 
English-language surnames